

The following lists events that happened during 1939 in Afghanistan.

A year of otherwise peaceful progress is broken by echoes of the trouble in Europe. The government declares its neutrality, but is reported to have ordered a general mobilization and to be exercising special vigilance on the Soviet frontier. In its attitude generally, Afghanistan is keeping touch with the other signatories of the Treaty of Saadabad, (Turkey, Iraq, and Iran).

Incumbents
 Monarch – Mohammed Zahir Shah
 Prime Minister – Mohammad Hashim Khan

May 1939
It is announced that the government has decided to privatize all government-owned factories.

September 7, 1939
In the week following the German invasion of Poland, hostilities against the government are opened on the eastern border by a tribal gathering from Tirah, but it is suppressed in little more than a week by joint action on the part of the Afghan and British authorities.

December 1939
The government announces the opening of a twice-weekly bus service between Kabul and Mazari Sharif, in Afghan Turkestan, a distance of 382 miles (615 km), by a road traversing the Hindu Kush which was first planned by King Nadir Shah.

 
Afghanistan
Years of the 20th century in Afghanistan
Afghanistan
1930s in Afghanistan